The Try Guys is an American online entertainment group and media production company which produces content for their YouTube channel. The group was founded by Keith Habersberger, Ned Fulmer, Zach Kornfeld, and Eugene Lee Yang. The Try Guys are known for testing a wide range of activities, such as testing their sperm count, raising toddlers, shaving their legs, and wearing women's underwear. The four men created The Try Guys while working for BuzzFeed, before forming their own company, 2nd Try LLC, in 2018. They have since expanded their company to include more than twenty employees, starred in a show on the Food Network, and released a book titled The Hidden Power of F*cking Up.  

Fulmer was removed from the company in September 2022 after news broke that he had engaged in an extramarital affair with an employee. , the channel hosts eleven spinoff series starring employees of the company and other collaborators.

History

BuzzFeed era (2014–2018) 
The group was formed at the company BuzzFeed in 2014 by then-employees Ned Fulmer, Eugene Lee Yang, Keith Habersberger, and Zach Kornfeld, with the creation of their first video "Guys Try Ladies' Underwear for the First Time". Elizabeth de Luna, for MTV News, highlighted that "in 2014, BuzzFeed had not yet developed a show around a recurring cast. [...] The Try Guys was the first series to consistently feature the same group of talent. It was also the first to turn BuzzFeed producers into on-camera personalities, a motif that now anchors BuzzFeed's original programming".

Their show Squad Wars premiered on YouTube Red in early 2017. Their most-watched video, "The Try Guys Try Labor Pain Simulation," has garnered over 35 million views as of March 2021. The group has accumulated over 100 million views among their videos on BuzzFeed's YouTube channel. In 2017, the Try Guys were nominated for the Streamy Awards audience choice: Show of the Year award. In 2018, the Try Guys hosted the 8th annual Streamy Awards and won the audience choice: Show of the Year award, the same one for which they had been nominated in 2017.

Independent studio (2018–present) 
On June 16, 2018, The Try Guys announced that they had left BuzzFeed and started their own independent production company, 2nd Try LLC. 2nd Try LLC gained all rights to The Try Guys brand; BuzzFeed remained as the branded content and advertising sales representative for several months. On December 2, 2019, the Try Guys explained that they decided to leave Buzzfeed as their contracts' expiring, with Kornfeld and Fulmer contributing to the idea of developing their own independent production company.

On their own YouTube channel, the Try Guys have received over 2.3 billion views and over 7.5 million subscribers. Slate highlighted that nearly 80% of their subscribers are women and that their audience "skews young, particularly women in their late teens and early 20s".

On January 30, 2019, the Try Guys announced that they'd co-written a book, The Hidden Power of F*cking Up. It was released by HarperCollins on June 18, 2019. The book follows each of the four Try Guys as they challenge themselves to improve their lives, discussing how their failures have impacted them and helped them grow. The Hidden Power of F*cking Up reached the number one position on the New York Times Best Seller list in the self help, advice, and miscellaneous category soon after its release. One review described it as "completely approachable in the way it's written… an honest, open discussion about failure." The group also went on tour, titled "Legends of the Internet", and launched The TryPod podcast in 2019.

By 2021, the company had grown to almost 24 employees. The Try Guys host the Food Network show No Recipe Road Trip with the Try Guys, inspired by their YouTube series Without A Recipe. The show, initially a one-off special, was due to premiere on Discovery+ and Food Network in 2021, but was postponed when it was ordered for a six-episode season, which premiered on August 31, 2022.

On September 27, 2022, the Try Guys announced that Fulmer would no longer be working with the group following an internal review regarding Fulmer having an extramarital affair with an employee. On October 3, 2022, the Try Guys announced that Fulmer would be removed from upcoming videos except in several sponsored videos, "ostensibly due to contractual obligations". Zoë Aiko Sonnenberg, writing for Slate, analyzed that beyond the Try Guys' comedy "shtick", their brand promises the "performance of authenticity" with personas as "good guys". Sonnenberg wrote, "to this end, all four of the Try Guys are very publicly partnered, and those partners have become famous themselves. [...] The Try Guys had to act quickly when Ned's character as a devoted husband and father fell apart and breached an essential contract with the audience."

Cast

Keith 
Keith Douglas Habersberger (born June 18, 1987) was born to Donald and Patricia Habersberger in Carthage, Tennessee. He is the youngest of three brothers, including Brian Habersberger, the creator of Twitch channel "Nothing, Forever". He is a graduate of Illinois State University with a Bachelor in acting and French horn. Habersberger is married to Rebecca "Becky" Habersberger (née Miller). Habersberger is reportedly , making him the tallest of the Try Guys.

Habersberger is part of the comedy music group Lewberger with Hughie Stone Fish and Alex Lewis. The group has appeared on several television talent shows, including Bring the Funny in 2018 and America's Got Talent in 2021.

He is known for his love of fried chicken and has focused on food-related content over the years, the most prominent shows being Eat the Menu, Chicken Watch, and Gourmet Garbage. He is also one of the creators of the Try Guys' series Without A Recipe. On November 30, 2019, Habersberger announced the release of his signature hot sauce, Keith's Chicken Sauce, which sold out within two days and was well received by consumers. Keith now has a line of Burger and Taco sauces also available through Heatonist.

Zach 
Zachary Andrew Kornfeld (born July 26, 1990). He was born to Jewish parents, Adam and Margo Kornfeld in Scarsdale, New York. He became involved in filmmaking and editing after receiving a LEGO Steven Spielberg Movie Maker Kit as a child. He is Jewish but does not keep kosher and did not have a bar mitzvah, though he did choose the Hebrew name Rakdan (Hebrew: רַקְדָן), meaning dancer. Kornfeld was diagnosed with ankylosing spondylitis in his late twenties. He graduated from Emerson College with a Bachelor of Fine Arts. As a child, he appeared on Saturday Night Live in an episode hosted by Elijah Wood that aired on December 13, 2003. In December 2018, he announced he had been in relationship for the past two years with Margaret Angela "Maggie" Bustamante, a pediatric nurse. In 2019, he decided to undergo hair restoration, a combination of surgery and microblading, to combat pattern hair loss. On May 13, 2020, Kornfeld announced his intention to start a six-part series on the Try Guys YouTube Channel challenge of starting his own business, Zadiko Tea Co., for less than $500. Kornfeld and Bustamante announced their engagement in August 2020 and married in February 2023.

Eugene 

Eugene Lee Yang (born January 18, 1986; Hangul: 양유진) was born to Korean immigrants, Jae Yang and Min-young Lee in Pflugerville, Texas. Yang graduated from the University of Southern California with a B.A. in Cinema Production. He regularly participates in LGBT pride events and has worked with The Trevor Project. Yang came out on June 15, 2019, in a YouTube video, "I'm Gay". In 2019, he announced that he has been in a long-term relationship with Matthew McLean.

Ned 
Edward Gallo "Ned" Fulmer (born June 11, 1987) was born in Jacksonville, Florida. He is a graduate of Yale University, where he majored in chemistry. He had a career working in a chemistry lab before he had a career change and started working at Buzzfeed, where Fulmer developed the video fellowship program. He previously lived in Chicago, working at a renewable energy lab by day and performing improv and sketch for Second City and iO Chicago house teams by night, where he was named a "Critic's Pick" by Time Out Chicago.

He is married to Ariel Fulmer (née VandeVoorde), an interior designer, and they have two children. The Verge highlighted that much of Fulmer's "public persona revolves around being a husband" and that he "successfully built a fanbase and brand around this relationship specifically", calling him a "wife guy". On September 27, 2022, it was announced that Fulmer would no longer be working with the group following an internal review regarding an extramarital affair with an employee.

Episodes

Main series

Spin-offs
Over the series of The Try Guys episodes, particular episodes have branched off as part of series of a specific topic or mini-series.

Tour 
On May 4, 2019, The Try Guys announced via YouTube that they would be embarking on a 20 city, nationwide tour (called “Legends of the Internet”) as a part of their “Summer of Try”. Then on July 30, 2019, The Try Guys announced they would be bringing Legends of The Internet to Australia and, later Singapore. Finally, on September 3, 2019, the group announced the final leg of the Legends of the Internet tour, this time in the Pacific Northwest (which was missed on the original run of the tour). In total, The Try Guys performed 26 shows of Legends of the Internet worldwide.

Legends of the Internet

Awards

References 

21st-century American comedians
2014 web series debuts
American comedy web series
American Internet groups
American non-fiction web series
American YouTube groups
BuzzFeed
Comedy-related YouTube channels
Shorty Award winners
Streamy Award-winning channels, series or shows
Web series producers
YouTube original programming